François Christiaan Erasmus (19 January 1896 – 1 July 1967) was a South African National Party politician and Minister of Defence from June 1948 to 1959 as well as Minister of Justice from 1959 to August 1961.

Early life
He was born on 19 January 1896 at Houtenbeck in the Merweville district of the Cape Colony to Marthinus Frederik Erasmus and his wife Hester Maria Jacoba Maritz. He was educated at the University of Cape Town and obtained a Bachelor of Laws degree.

Career 
In 1927 he was appointed Deputy Attorney-General of South West Africa. In 1928, he returned to South Africa and became the assistant-secretary of the National Party in the Cape Province. In 1930, he was appointed organising secretary of the same party. Afterwards he entered politics and was elected to Parliament in 1933 as the member for Moorreesburg. He joined D F Malan's cabinet as the Minister of Defence in 1948. He modernised the South African Defence Force by establishing the training gymnasiums for officers in the army, navy and air force. He was also involved in the establishment of the South African Military Academy. He negotiated the Simonstown Agreement, the return of the naval base from Royal Navy control.

He was widely considered to be incompetent and was very unpopular because of his broad changes to the military to remove what he called the "British Influence". This included the removal of items such as the Red Tabs (Rooi Luise) and the retrenchment or firing of numerous English-speaking officers and the appointment of Afrikaner ones in their place.

He was appointed Minister of Justice in 1959, in the Hendrik Verwoerd cabinet. After his term as Minister of Justice he was appointed Ambassador to Italy from 1961 until 1965.

Marriage
Erasmus first married Christina Wiese of Melsetter in the then Southern Rhodesia.  They had a son and a daughter.  On 9 January 1946 he married Cornelia Margaretha (Corrie) Naudé of Lydenburg.  They had three daughters.

Honours
A Strike Craft  of the South African Navy was named after him.

References 

1896 births
1967 deaths
Afrikaner people
Defence ministers of South Africa
Justice ministers of South Africa
National Party (South Africa) politicians
Ambassadors of South Africa to Italy
20th-century South African lawyers